The algae genus Mallomonas contains the following species, forms, and varieties:

A

Mallomonas acaroides Zacharias
Mallomonas actinoloma E.Takahashi
Mallomonas actinoloma var. maramuresensis L.Péterfi & Momeu
Mallomonas actinoloma var. nadiensis Dürrschmidt
Mallomonas aculeata 
Mallomonas adamas K.Harris & D.E.Bradley
Mallomonas aerolata Nygaard
Mallomonas akrokomos Ruttner
Mallomonas alata Asmund, Cronberg & Dürrschmidt
Mallomonas alata f. hualvensis Asmund, Cronberg & Dürrschmidt
Mallomonas allorgei (Deflandre) W.Conrad
Mallomonas alpestrina Němcová & Zeisek
Mallomonas alphaphora Preisig
Mallomonas alpina Pascher & Ruttner
Mallomonas alveolata Dürrschmidt
Mallomonas amazonica Vigna, S.R.Duque & Múñez-Avellaneda
Mallomonas americana Dürrschmidt
Mallomonas ampla P.A.Siver & A.M.Lott
Mallomonas anglica (N.Carter) Huber-Pestalozzi
Mallomonas annulata (D.E.Bradley) K.Harris
Mallomonas aperturae Siver
Mallomonas apochromatica Conrad
Mallomonas areolata Nygaard
Mallomonas asmundiae (Wujek & van der Veer) Nicholls
Mallomonas asymmetrica C.-X. Ma & Y.-X.Wei
Mallomonas australica Playfair
Mallomonas australica var. gracillima Playfair
Mallomonas australica var. subglobosa Playfair

B

Mallomonas bacterium Conrad
Mallomonas bangladeshica (E.Takahashi & T.Hayakawa) Siver & A.P.Wolfe
Mallomonas baskettei P.A.Siver & A.M.Lott
Mallomonas binocularis P.A.Siver
Mallomonas bronchartiana Compère

C

Mallomonas caerula P.A.Siver
Mallomonas calceolus D.E.Bradley
Mallomonas camerunensis Piątek
Mallomonas canina Kristiansen
Mallomonas cattiensis E.S.Gusev, H.Doan-Nhu & L.Nguyen-Ngoc
Mallomonas caudata Iwanoff
Mallomonas ceylanica Dürrschmidt & G.Cronberg
Mallomonas charkoviensis Kisselew
Mallomonas clavata Conrad
Mallomonas clavus D.E.Bradley
Mallomonas connensis P.A.Siver & L.J.Marsicano
Mallomonas conspersa Dürrschmidt
Mallomonas convallis P.A.Siver & A.P.Wolfe
Mallomonas corcontica (Kalina) L.Péterfi & Momeu
Mallomonas coronata Bolochonzew
Mallomonas coronifera Matvienko
Mallomonas corymbosa Asmund
Mallomonas corymbosa var. interrupta M.S.Vigna & J.Kristiansen
Mallomonas corymbosa var. poseidonii P.A.Siver
Mallomonas costata Dürrschmidt
Mallomonas crassisquama (Asmund) Fott
Mallomonas crassisquama var. papillosa P.A.Siver & A.Skogstad
Mallomonas cratis K.Harris & D.E.Bradley
Mallomonas cristata Dürrschmidt
Mallomonas crocodilorum P.Hansen
Mallomonas cronbergiae Piątek
Mallomonas cucullata S.Barreto
Mallomonas cyathellata Wujek & Asmund
Mallomonas cyathellata var. chilensis Dürrschmidt
Mallomonas cyathellata var. kenyana Wujek & Asmund
Mallomonas cylindracea Pascher

D

Mallomonas delanciana P.A.Siver
Mallomonas denticulata Matvienko
Mallomonas dickii K.H.Nicholls
Mallomonas directa Nemková et al.
Mallomonas dispar Siver, Lott & Wolfe
Mallomonas distinguenda <small>Gusev et al.</small>Mallomonas divida Němcová & J. KreidlováMallomonas doignonii Bourrelly
Mallomonas doignonii var. robusticostis K.H.Nicholls
Mallomonas doignonii var. tenuicostis Asmund & CronbergMallomonas duerrschmidtiae P.A.Siver, J.S.Hamer & H.J.Kling

EMallomonas elegans LemmermannMallomonas elephantus P.A.Siver & A.P.WolfeMallomonas elliptica (Kisselev) W.ConradMallomonas elongata Reverdin
Mallomonas elongata var. americana BourrellyMallomonas eoa E.TakahashiMallomonas epithallatia Droop

FMallomonas favosa K.H.Nicholls
Mallomonas favosa f. gemina Dürrschmidt & CroomeMallomonas fenestrata Cronbeg & B.HickelMallomonas fimbriata E.S.GusevMallomonas flora K.Harris & D.E.Bradley
Mallomonas flora var. palermii VignaMallomonas formosa S.BarretoMallomonas fresenii KentMallomonas fuegiana Vigna & KristiansenMallomonas furtiva Gusev, Certnerová, Škaloudová & ŠkaloudMallomonas fusiformis Wermel

GMallomonas galeiformis K.H.NichollsMallomonas giraffensis P.A.Siver & A.P.WolfeMallomonas glabra N.Woodhead & R.D.TweedMallomonas globosa SchillerMallomonas grata E.TakahashiMallomonas grossa DürrschmidtMallomonas guttata Wujek
Mallomonas guttata var. simplex K.H.Nicholls

HMallomonas hamata AsmundMallomonas harrisiae E.TakahashiMallomonas heimii BourrellyMallomonas helvetica PascherMallomonas heterospina J.W.G.Lund
Mallomonas heterospina f. calida Vigna
Mallomonas heterospina var. ornata BourrellyMallomonas heverlensis (Conrad) ConradMallomonas hexagonis K.H.NichollsMallomonas hexareticulata B.Y.Jo, W.Shin, H.S.Kim, P.A.Siver & R.A.AndersenMallomonas hindonii K.H.NichollsMallomonas hirsuta Conrad

IMallomonas inornata K.H.NichollsMallomonas insignis Penard
Mallomonas insignis var. lacustris BourrellyMallomonas intermedia Kisselew/Kisselev
Mallomonas intermedia var. salicaensis Péterfi & Momeu

JMallomonas jejuensis H.S.Kim & J.H.KimMallomonas jubata Nemková et al.

KMallomonas kalinae RezácovaMallomonas koreana H.S.Kim & J.H.KimMallomonas kristiansenii Wujek & C.M.BicudoMallomonas kuzminii E.S.Gusev & M.S.Kulikovskiy

LMallomonas labyrinthina K.H.NichollsMallomonas lacuna B.Y.Jo, W.Shin, H.S.Kim, P.A.Siver & R.A.AndersenMallomonas lanalhuensis DürrschmidtMallomonas lancea Siver, Lott & WolfeMallomonas leboimei BourrellyMallomonas lefeuvrei VilleretMallomonas lefevriana BourrellyMallomonas lelymene K.Harris & D.E.BradleyMallomonas lemuriocellata P.HansenMallomonas lilloënsis ConradMallomonas limnicola J.W.G.LundMallomonas litomesa A.Stokes
Mallomonas litomesa var. curta PlayfairMallomonas liturata K.H.NichollsMallomonas longiseta (Lemmermann) LemmermannMallomonas lychenensis W.Conrad
Mallomonas lychenensis f. ecuadorensis Wujek & Dziedzik
Mallomonas lychenensis f. symposiaca Skogstad & Kristiansen

MMallomonas maculata D.E.BradleyMallomonas madagascarensis P.HansenMallomonas majorensis SkujaMallomonas mangofera K.Harris & D.E.Bradley
Mallomonas mangofera var. foveata (Dürrschmidt) Kristiansen
Mallomonas mangofera var. gracilis (Dürrschmidt) Kristiansen
Mallomonas mangofera var. reticulata (Cronberg) Kristiansen
Mallomonas mangofera var. sulcata DürrschmidtMallomonas marsupialis R.Croome, J.Kristiansen & P.A.TylerMallomonas matvienkoae B.Asmund & Kristiansen
Mallomonas matvienkoae f. litteata Dürrschmidt ex B.Asmund & J.Kristiansen
Mallomonas matvienkoae var. grandis Dürrschmidt & G.Cronberg
Mallomonas matvienkoae var. myakkana P.A.Siver
Mallomonas matvienkoae var. siveri Wujek & L.C.SahaMallomonas media P.A.Siver & A.M.LottMallomonas minima L.RehfousMallomonas mirabilis ConradMallomonas monograptus K.Harris & D.E.BradleyMallomonas morrisonensis Croome & P.A.TylerMallomonas moskowensis WermelMallomonas multisetigera DürrschmidtMallomonas multiunca Asmund
Mallomonas multiunca var. pocosinensis P.A.SiverMallomonas munda (Asmund, Cronberg & Dürrschmidt) NemkováMallomonas muskokana (K.H.Nicholls) P.A.Siver

NMallomonas neoampla E.Gusev & P.A.SiverMallomonas newfoundlandicus P.A. SiverMallomonas nieringii P.A.SiverMallomonas nuussuaqensis L.R.Wilken & J.Kristiansen

OMallomonas ocalensis P.A.SiverMallomonas ocellata Dürrschmidt & CroomeMallomonas ouradion K.Harris & D.E.BradleyMallomonas oviformis Nygaard

PMallomonas padulosa FottMallomonas palaestrica P.Hansen, J.E.Johansen & A.SkovgaardMallomonas paludosa FottMallomonas papillosa K.Harris & D.E.Bradley
Mallomonas papillosa var. ellipsoidea K.Harris
Mallomonas papillosa var. monilifera K.HarrisMallomonas paragrandis GusevMallomonas parana Vigna & KristiansenMallomonas parisiae BourrellyMallomonas parvula Dürrschmidt
Mallomonas parvula var. nichollsii Wujek & R.G.BlandMallomonas paxillata (D.E.Bradley) L.S.Péterfi & MomeuMallomonas pechlaneri Němcová & RottMallomonas perfossa K.H.NichollsMallomonas peroneides (K.Harris) Momeu & L.S.PéterfiMallomonas perpusilla DürrschmidtMallomonas phasma K.Harris & D.E.BradleyMallomonas pillula K.Harris
Mallomonas pillula f. exannulata K.Harris
Mallomonas pillula f. labyrinthopsis Wujek
Mallomonas pillula var. latimorginalis Dürrschmidt
Mallomonas pillula var. valdiviana DürrschmidtMallomonas plantefolii BourrellyMallomonas pleuriforamen P.A.Siver, Lott, B.Y.Jo, W.Shin, H.S.Kim & R.A.AndersenMallomonas ploesslii Perty - Type speciesMallomonas plumosa Croome & P.A.TylerMallomonas porifera P.A.Siver & A.P.WolfeMallomonas portae-ferreae L.Péterfi & Asmund
Mallomonas portae-ferreae var. reticulata Gretz, Sommerfeld & WujekMallomonas preisigii P.A.SiverMallomonas producta Iwanhoff
Mallomonas producta var. marchica LemmermannMallomonas prora DürrschmidtMallomonas pseudobronchartiana E.S.Gusev, P.A. Siver & W.ShinMallomonas pseudocaudata P.A.Siver & A.P.WolfeMallomonas pseudocoronata PrescottMallomonas pseudocratis DürrschmidtMallomonas pseudohamata P.A.Siver & A.P.WolfeMallomonas pseudomatvienkoae B.Y.Jo, W.Shin, H.S.Kim, P.A.Siver & R.A.AndersenMallomonas pseudotonsurata BourrellyMallomonas pugio D.E.BradleyMallomonas pulcherrima (Stokes) LemmermannMallomonas pulchra ConradMallomonas pumilio K.Harris & D.E.Bradley
Mallomonas pumilio var. dispersa Nemková et al.
Mallomonas pumilio f. munda Asmund, Cronberg & DürrschmidtMallomonas punctifera Korshikov
Mallomonas punctifera var. brasiliensis J.Kristiansen & M.Menezes

RMallomonas radiata ConradMallomonas rasilis DürrschmidtMallomonas recticostata E.TakahashiMallomonas reeuwlijkiana W.ConradMallomonas retifera DürrschmidtMallomonas retrorsa P.A.SiverMallomonas rhombica G.CronbergMallomonas roscida Dürrschmidt

SMallomonas sabulosa Croome & P.A.TylerMallomonas salina W.ConradMallomonas scalaris DürrschmidtMallomonas schumachii P.A.SiverMallomonas schwemmlei GlenkMallomonas scrobiculata K.H.NichollsMallomonas serrata NichollsMallomonas sexangularis K.H.NichollsMallomonas silvicola (Harris & D.E.Bradley) NemkováMallomonas skvortsovii Gusev et al.Mallomonas sonfonensis N.Woodhead & R.D.TweedMallomonas sophiae CzosnowskiMallomonas sorohexareticulata B.Y.Jo, W.Shin, H.S.Kim, P.A.Siver & R.A.AndersenMallomonas sphagniphila K.H.NichollsMallomonas spinifera SchillerMallomonas spinosa E.S.GusevMallomonas spinulosa ConradMallomonas splendens (G.S.West) Playfair
Mallomonas splendens f. arnhemensis Croome, Dürrschmidt & P.A.Tyler
Mallomonas splendens var. biceps W.Conrad
Mallomonas splendens var. pusilla PlayfairMallomonas stellata G.CronbergMallomonas striata Asmund
Mallomonas striata var. balonovii Voloshko
Mallomonas striata var. getseniae Voloshko
Mallomonas striata var. serrata K.Harris & D.E.BradleyMallomonas strictopteris Péterfi & MomeuMallomonas subsalina Conrad & Kufferath

TMallomonas tasmanica (Croome & P.A.Tyler) Asmund & KristiansenMallomonas teilingii W.ConradMallomonas temonis NěmcováMallomonas tenuis ConradMallomonas tirolensis Pichrtová et al.Mallomonas tolerans Asmund & J.KristiansenMallomonas tongarirensis DürrschmidtMallomonas tonsurata Teiling
Mallomonas tonsurata var. coroniferoides K.H.Nicholls
Mallomonas tonsurata var. etortisetifera X.Zhang, I.Inouye & M.ChiharaMallomonas torquata B.Asmund & G.Cronberg
Mallomonas torquata var. simplex (K.H.Nicholls) KristiansenMallomonas torulosa KisselevMallomonas transsylvanica L.S.Péterfi & MomeuMallomonas trichophora BourrellyMallomonas tropica Dürrschmidt & CroomeMallomonas trummensis CronbergMallomonas tubulosa S.Barreto

UMallomonas urnaformis Prescott

VMallomonas valkanoviana ConradMallomonas vannigera Asmund
Mallomonas vannigera var. parallelicosta BalonovMallomonas variabilis G.CronbergMallomonas velari E.S.Gusev, P.A. Siver & W.ShinMallomonas verrucosa VignaMallomonas villosa DürrschmidtMallomonas vorkutiensis Voloshko

WMallomonas weei D.E.Wujek, E.M.Wright & G.L.WilliamsMallomonas wujekii P.A.Siver

ZMallomonas zellensis'' Fott

References

Ochrophyta
Lists of algae
Taxonomic lists (species)